Brachiosia is a monotypic moth genus in the subfamily Arctiinae. Its only species, Brachiosia castaneola, is found on the Sangihe Islands of Indonesia. Both the genus and species were first described by George Hampson in 1900.

References

Lithosiini
Monotypic moth genera
Moths of Indonesia